Danuta Straszyńska (born 4 February 1942) is a Polish former hurdler and sprinter. She won the 80 metres hurdles title at the 1965 Universiade in 10.6 seconds, and won a gold medal in the 4 x 100 metres relay at the 1966 European Championships. She went on to finish sixth in the 80 metres hurdles final at the 1968 Mexico City Olympics in 10.6 seconds.

References

1942 births
Living people
Athletes (track and field) at the 1968 Summer Olympics
Athletes (track and field) at the 1972 Summer Olympics
Polish female sprinters
Polish female hurdlers
Olympic athletes of Poland
People from Ostrowiec Świętokrzyski
Sportspeople from Świętokrzyskie Voivodeship
Universiade medalists in athletics (track and field)
European Athletics Championships medalists
Universiade gold medalists for Poland
Medalists at the 1965 Summer Universiade